Flupentixol/melitracen (trade name Frenxit, Franxit, Placida, Deanxit, Anxidreg, Danxipress, Mocalm) is a combination of two psychoactive agents flupentixol and melitracen. It is designed for short term usage only. It is produced by Lundbeck.

Flupentixol is a thiazolyl (thioanthracene) antipsychotic, and melitracen is a tricyclic antidepressant. Low dose Flupentixol (0.5mg-3mg) has antidepressant and antianxiety effects, while melitracen has antidepressant effect. The mixture of the two components is used to treat mild to moderate mental disorders.

Action
Flupentixol inhibits dopamine-mediated effects by blocking postsynaptic dopamine receptors in the CNS. 

Melitracen is a TCA with anxiolytic properties. At low doses, it has activating properties. It is also a bipolar thymoleptic.

Pharmacokinetics
Absorption: Flupentixol: Readily absorbed in the GI tract.

Distribution: Flupentixol: >95% bound to plasma proteins; widely distributed in the body and crosses the blood brain barrier.

Metabolism: Flupentixol: Extensively hepatic metabolism.

Excretion: Flupentixol: Excreted in urine and faeces in the form of many metabolites.

ATC Classification
N06AA14 - melitracen ; Belongs to the class of non-selective monoamine reuptake inhibitors. Used in the management of depression.

N05AF01 - flupentixol ; Belongs to the class of thioxanthene derivatives antipsychotics.

Route of Administration

Oral

Indications for Use

Mild to moderate depression

Anxiety

Asthenia

Dosage
Adult: Per tablet contains flupentixol 0.5 mg and melitracen 10 mg: 1 tablet in the morning and at midday. May double morning dose in severe cases. Not to exceed 4 tablets daily.

Elderly: Per tablet contains flupentixol 0.5 mg and melitracen 10 mg: 1 tablet in the morning. For severe cases: 1 tablet in the morning and at midday.

Contraindications
Circulatory collapse, depressed level of consciousness due to any cause, Coma. Severe depression requiring hospitalisation or electroconvulsive therapy. Not recommended for use in states of excitement or overactivity.

Special Precautions
Unsafe in porphyria. Caution when used in patients with epilepsy; Parkinson's disease; narrow angle glaucoma; prostatic hypertrophy; hypothyroidism; hyperthyroidism; liver disease; cardiac disease or arrhythmias; severe respiratory disease; renal failure; myasthenia gravis; phaeochromocytoma. Patients with hypersensitivity to thioxanthenes or other antipsychotics.
Close monitoring for changes in behaviour, suicidal thoughts or clinical worsening during the initial part of the treatment is recommended.
May impair control of diabetes; monitor blood glucose in diabetics.
Withdrawal should be gradual.

Adverse Reactions
Drowsiness, dry mouth, constipation, vomiting, dyspepsia, diarrhoea, abdominal pain, nausea, flatulence. Extrapyramidal effects, especially in the initial phase of the treatment. Tachycardia, palpitations, prolonged QT interval, hypotension. Thrombocytopenia, neutropenia, leukopenia, agranulocytosis. Dyspnoea, myalgia, muscle rigidity, micturition disorder, urinary retention. Increased appetite and weight. Abnormal glucose tolerance and LFTs. Insomnia, depression, nervousness, agitation, decreased libido.

Drug Interactions
Increased risk of adverse effects when used with alcohol. May potentiate the effects of general anaesthetics and anticoagulants, and prolong the action of neuromuscular blockers. May increase anticholinergic effects of atropine and drugs with anticholinergic activity. May increase risk of neurotoxicity when used with sibutramine or lithium. Avoid concurrent usage with drugs that cause QT prolongation or cardiac arrhythmias. May inhibit metabolism of TCAs. May antagonise effects of adrenaline and sympathomimetics, and reverse antihypertensive effects of guanethidine.

Other Brand names
Brand names include:
 Pentoxol.m  (scotmann pharmaceuticals Pakistan)
 Sensit (Eskayef Bangladesh Ltd.)
 Renxit (Renata Ltd.)
 Melixol (Square Pharmaceuticals Ltd.)
 Melanxit (Organic Health Care Ltd.)
 Benzit (Bio-Pharma Ltd.)
 Leanxit (ACME Laboratories Ltd.)
 Danxipress (Vickmans Lab Ltd.)
 Amilax (Amico Lab Ltd)
 Angenta (Healthcare Pharmaceuticals Ltd.)
 EXZILOR (SUN PHARMA LABORATORIES LTD.)
 Mocalm (Swiss Pharmaceutical Co. Ltd. 瑞士藥廠股份有限公司新市廠)

See also
 Amitriptyline/perphenazine
 Olanzapine/fluoxetine
 Tranylcypromine/trifluoperazine

References

Antidepressants
Antipsychotics
Combination drugs